{{Infobox film
| name           = The Swimmer
| image          = The Swimmer poster.jpg
| caption        = Theatrical release poster
| director       = Frank Perry
| producer       = Frank PerryRoger Lewis
| based_on       = {{based on|"The Swimmer"1964 story in 'The New Yorker|John Cheever}}
| screenplay     = Eleanor Perry
| starring       = Burt LancasterJanet LandgardJanice Rule
| music          = Marvin Hamlisch
| cinematography = David L. Quaid
| editing        = Sidney KatzCarl LernerPat Somerset
| studio         = Horizon Pictures
| distributor    = Columbia Pictures
| released       = 
| runtime        = 95 minutes
| country        = United States
| language       = English
| budget         = 
}}The Swimmer is a 1968 American surrealist drama film starring Burt Lancaster. The film was written and directed by Academy Award-nominated husband-and-wife team of Eleanor Perry (screenplay adaptation) and Frank Perry (director). The story is based on the 1964 short story "The Swimmer" by John Cheever, which appeared in the July 18, 1964, issue of The New Yorker. The 95-minute movie adds new characters and scenes consistent with those in the original 12-page short story.

Plot
In an autumnal forest, strewn with dead leaves someone is running. It borders an affluent suburb in Connecticut. Out of the forest a fit and tanned middle-aged man emerges wearing nothing but a bathing suit and no shoes. It is Ned Merrill and he drops by a pool party being held by old friends. They offer him a cocktail while nursing hangovers from the night before. He gives no indication where he has been or for how long. As they share stories, Ned realizes there is a series of backyard swimming pools that could form a "river" back to his house, making it possible for him to "swim his way home". Ned dives into the pool, emerging at the other end and beginning his journey. Ned's behavior perplexes his friends, who apparently know worrisome things about his recent past which he seems to have forgotten.

As Ned travels, he encounters other neighbors. He meets 20-year-old Julie, who used to babysit his daughters (whom he repeatedly refers to as "at home playing tennis"), and reveals his plan to her; she joins him. They crash another pool party and sip champagne. Multiple guests know Ned and ask him where he's been but he doesn't answer their questions or elaborate. While chatting in a grove of trees, Julie reveals that she had a schoolgirl crush on Ned. After she tells him about two sexual incidents in her workplace, Ned begins talking about how he will protect her, making plans for the two of them. Discomfited by his intimate approaches, Julie runs away.

Ned meets a wealthy, nudist, older couple, who are unbothered by his eccentric behavior but also unimpressed by his posturing. He then encounters Kevin, a lonely young boy, whom he tries to teach how to swim. They use an abandoned, empty pool, which Ned urges the boy to imagine is filled with water. The boy warms to this method, and soon is "swimming" the length of the empty pool. As Ned takes his leave, he glances back and sees the boy bouncing on the diving board over the deep end of the empty pool. He rushes back to remove him from the diving board, then departs.

He is challenged by a middle-aged woman for using her pool uninvited. She is highly critical of the way in which he had not supported or visited her son whist he was very ill. When Ned implies that the son recovered anyway, the subject is left hanging giving the impression that the son's illness led to his death.

Ned fails to make more than a superficial connection with the people he meets, being obsessed with his journey, and becoming increasingly out of touch with reality. The neighborhood consists of judgmental, well-heeled people intent on one-upmanship, and Ned is confused by hints that his life might not be as untroubled as he believes.

Ned walks into another party where the hostess calls him a "party crasher". He encounters a bubbly girl named Joan, who does not know him. Ned asks her to join him, and Joan is intrigued until his speech becomes more fantastical. A friend leads her away from him. Ned jumps into the pool, making a big splash which grabs the attention of the guests. When he emerges from the water, he notices a hot dog cart that used to be his. Ned gets into a spat with the homeowner, who claims to have bought it at a white elephant sale.

Ned shows up at the backyard pool of Shirley Abbott, a stage actress with whom he had an affair several years earlier. His warm memories of their time together contrast with her own experience of being "the other woman". Unable to reconcile his feelings with the pain he caused, Ned wades into the deep end of the pool.

Ned trudges barefoot alongside a busy highway, then reaches a crowded public swimming pool. After being treated demeaningly by the gatekeeper, he encounters a group of local shop owners who derisively ask him "How do you like our water?" They indicate surprise at his appearance at such a plebeian location and ask him when he will settle his unpaid bills. When some of them make vicious comments about his wife's snobbish tastes and his out-of-control daughters' recent troubles with the law, Ned flees.
 
The skies darken and rain begins falling. Amid a downpour at sunset, a shivering, limping Ned staggers home; the tennis court where his daughters were supposedly playing is in disrepair, and his house is locked and deserted, with several windows broken. Anguished, Ned repeatedly tries to open the door, before slumping to the ground in the doorway.

Cast

Casting notes
 After working on several television series, Janet Landgard's first featured cinematic role was in this film.
 The Swimmer was comedian Joan Rivers's film debut as an actress. She had appeared as herself three years earlier in Hootenanny a Go Go, also released as Once Upon a Coffeehouse. In The Swimmer, her short scene took an unexpectedly long time to film, which she blamed on Lancaster. She later wrote in her autobiography; "he redirected every line...Frank (Perry) wanted a happy girl who then got hurt. Lancaster was going to be Mr. Wonderful who came up against a mean bitch, and was right not to go off with her. Trying to please both men, I was going back and forth between line readings, and nothing made sense."
 Janice Rule replaced Barbara Loden in the part of Shirley Abbott.
 Author John Cheever has a cameo appearance in the film in a brief scene greeting the characters played by Lancaster and Landgard.

ProductionThe Swimmer was produced by Sam Spiegel, a three-time Academy Award for Best Picture winner, who ultimately removed his name from the film (although the logo of his company, Horizon Pictures, remains). It was filmed largely on location in Westport, Connecticut, hometown of director Frank Perry.

Although he was a trained athlete, star Burt Lancaster had a fear of the water, and took swimming lessons from former Olympian and UCLA water polo coach Bob Horn to prepare for the film.

After principal photography from July to September 1966, Perry expected to shoot additional transition scenes but was ultimately fired by Spiegel. The producers instead brought in Lancaster's friend, the young director Sydney Pollack and cinematographer Michael Nebbia for January 1967 reshoots in California. Pollack reportedly shot several transitions and scenes, including scenes with Kim Hunter replacing Sally Gracie, Charles Drake replacing Larry Haines, Bernie Hamilton replacing Billy Dee Williams and Janice Rule replacing Barbara Loden. According to Eleanor Perry, Sam Spiegel and Elia Kazan both had an interest in getting the scene where Merrill assaults Abbott toned down and subsequently each blamed the other for Loden's replacement. In addition to the above scenes, Pollack and Nebbia also shot the scene with Lancaster and the horse as well as some retakes of the Song of Songs scene. According to Lancaster, when the film still needed an additional day of shooting, he paid $10,000 for it out of his own pocket.

Soundtrack

The score was composed by a first-time film composer, 24-year-old Marvin Hamlisch, and was orchestrated by Leo Shuken and Jack Hayes. The music has dramatic passages for a small orchestra along with a mid-1960s pop sound. Hamlisch got the job after Spiegel hired him to play the piano at one of his legendary parties. The soundtrack album was originally released as an LP by CBS Records in 1968, while the complete score was released in 2006 by Film Score Monthly.

Reception 
The initial box office response to the film was "lackluster" but the critical response has improved in recent years, with the movie gaining cult film status. Film critic Roger Ebert called The Swimmer "a strange, stylized work, a brilliant and disturbing one." Vincent Canby in The New York Times wrote: "although literal in style, the film has the shape of an open-ended hallucination. It is a grim, disturbing and sometimes funny view of a very small, very special segment of upper-middle-class American life." Variety said: "a lot of people are not going to understand this film; many will loathe it; others will be moved deeply. Its detractors will be most vocal; its supporters will not have high-powered counter-arguments."

After the film's restoration and re-release by Grindhouse Releasing in 2014, Brian Orndorf of Blu-ray.com gave the Blu-ray release five stars, commenting; "it's a strange picture, but engrossingly so, taking the viewer on a journey of self-delusion and nostalgia that gradually exposes a richly tortured main character as he attempts to immerse himself in a life that's no longer available to him", commenting that Lancaster gives a "deeply felt, gut-rot performance...and communicates every emotional beat with perfection".

On Rotten Tomatoes the film has an approval rating of 100%, based on reviews from 23 critics, with an average rating of 7.7/10.

Home mediaThe Swimmer was originally released on DVD in 2003. The 2003 release was considered a "ho-hum looking widescreen transfer ... (with) a number of imperfections (including grain and dirt aplenty)", the image suffering from "a true lack of detail and bleeding colors" and was criticized for having few special features.

In March 2014, Grindhouse Releasing/Box Office (in co-operation with Columbia) released The Swimmer on Blu-ray in high definition. The release received positive reviews, with Blu-ray.com giving it a rare five stars. Eccentric Cinema praised the company, saying "Grindhouse have been establishing themselves as the Criterion of offbeat cinema... They have taken a previously rare, and quite obscure, title and given it the special edition treatment that its fans have long dreamt of. The two-disc DVD/Blu-ray combo pack is attractively packaged and is stuffed to the gills with extras, but first things first: the film itself looks stunning in a new high definition, 1.85/16x9 transfer."

Extras on the release include a five-part documentary, The Story of the Swimmer, which includes comments from surviving production and cast members including Janet Landgard, Joan Rivers, Marge Champion, first and second assistant directors Michael Hertzberg and Ted Zachary, Bob Horn, as well as Lancaster's daughter Joanna, and archival interviews with composer Marvin Hamlisch and editor Sidney Katz. Reviewer Troy Howarth of Eccentric Cinema remarked: "It's a brilliant piece of work by editor/director Chris Innis and it definitely raises the bar of what one can expect with such retrospective featurettes." Brian Orndorf of Blu-ray.com commented: "The Story of The Swimmer...is a miraculous five-part documentary from Innis that dissects the feature in full...the candor put forth here is outstanding, generating a riveting tale of a Hollywood tug of war...It's an exhaustive documentary, but there's never a dull moment."

Also included in the release are title sequence outtakes, Frank Perry's storyboards, production stills (including Loden's deleted scene), trailers, TV spots, an audio recording of Cheever reading the original short story, as well as a 12-page color booklet with essays by filmmaker Stuart Gordon and Innis. The cover sleeve comes with new cover art from illustrator Glen Orbik. There is also a separate 2013 interview with Champion. The International Press Academy has recognized Grindhouse Releasing's restoration of The Swimmer'' with a 2015 Satellite Award for "Outstanding Overall Blu-Ray/DVD".

See also
 List of American films of 1968

References

External links
 
 
 
 

1968 drama films
1968 films
American drama films
Horizon Pictures films
Columbia Pictures films
Films based on short fiction
Films scored by Marvin Hamlisch
Films directed by Frank Perry
Films set in Connecticut
Swimming films
Films shot in Connecticut
1960s English-language films
1960s American films